Stan Ackerley (born 12 July 1942 in Manchester, Lancashire, England) is an Australian former footballer and coach.

Playing career

Club career
Ackerley spent two seasons on the books of Manchester United from 1959 until 1961 where he played in the youth team. During the 1961–62 season he played two matches for Oldham Athletic before joining Kidderminster Harriers later in the season. In 1962 he signed for Altrincham, playing 17 matches during the 1962–63 season.

In 1963 Ackerley immigrated to Australia where he joined Slavia in the Victorian State League. The following year he moved to the NSW State League where he turned out for APIA on a $4,500 fee. Apart from a short stint back in England for Witton Albion, he played at APIA until 1970.

International career
Ackerley made his debut for Australia in their 6-1 defeat to North Korea in November 1965 in Phnom Penh. He was captain of the Socceroos in three matches, the first in a match against Japan in Melbourne in 1968. He played the last of his 27 full international matches against Israel in Sydney in December 1969.

Coaching career
After retiring from football Ackerley coached a number of teams in New South Wales including Toongabbie, Penrith Panthers and Schofields Scorpions. He also spent two seasons as an assistant coach at Canterbury-Marrickville.

See also 
 Foreign-born footballers who played for Australia

References

1942 births
Australian soccer players
Australia international soccer players
English emigrants to Australia
Manchester United F.C. players
Witton Albion F.C. players
Sydney United 58 FC players
Altrincham F.C. players
Kidderminster Harriers F.C. players
Oldham Athletic A.F.C. players
Footballers from Manchester
Living people
Association football fullbacks